The 1980 Prix de l'Arc de Triomphe was a horse race held at Longchamp on Sunday 5 October 1980. It was the 59th running of the Prix de l'Arc de Triomphe.

The winner was Detroit, a three-year-old filly trained in France by Oliver Douieb. The winning jockey was Pat Eddery who was winning the race for the first time. The filly won by half a length and a short head from Argument and Ela-Mana-Mou.

The winning time of 2m 28.0s was a new record for the race.

Race details
 Sponsor: none
 Purse: 
 Going: Firm
 Distance: 2,400 metres
 Number of runners: 20
 Winner's time: 2m 28.0s

Full result

* Abbreviations: shd = short-head; nk = neck

Winner's details
Further details of the winner, Detroit.
 Sex: Filly
 Foaled: 24 February 1977
 Country: France
 Sire: Riverman; Dam: Derna (Sunny Boy)
 Owner: Robert Sangster
 Breeder: Societe Aland

References

Prix de l'Arc de Triomphe
 1980
Prix de l'Arc de Triomphe
Prix de l'Arc de Triomphe
Prix de l'Arc de Triomphe